Bolshoy Morets is a rural locality (a selo) and the administrative center of Bolshemoretskoye Rural Settlement, Yelansky District, Volgograd Oblast, Russia. The population was 1,438 as of 2010. There are 10 streets.

Geography 
Bolshoy Morets is located on Khopyorsko-Buzulukskaya Plain, 14 km southeast of Yelan (the district's administrative centre) by road. Tersa is the nearest rural locality.

References 

Rural localities in Yelansky District